The Kourkouas or Curcuas (from , Gurgen) family was, allegedly, one of the many nakharar families from Armenia that migrated to the Byzantine Empire during the period of Arab rule over Armenia (7th–9th centuries) although the latter is mostly speculative and widely debated. They rose to prominence as part of the Anatolian military aristocracy in the 10th century, providing several high-ranking generals and an emperor. They intermarried extensively with the aristocratic families of Phokas and Skleros. In the 11th and 12th centuries, they shifted to the civilian bureaucracy.

Famous members 
John Kourkouas (9th c.), Domestic of the Hikanatoi regiment and conspirator against Basil I
John Kourkouas (10th c.), grandson of the above, Domestic of the Schools of the East and famous general under Romanos I Lekapenos
Theophilos Kourkouas, brother of John, strategos of Chaldia and later Domestic of the Schools
Romanos Kourkouas, son of John Kourkouas and Domestic of the Schools of the West
John Kourkouas, son of Romanos, Domestic of the Schools of the East, killed in the Siege of Dorostolon
John I Tzimiskes (c. 925–976), grandson of Theophilos Kourkouas, Byzantine Emperor in 969–976
John Kourkouas (11th c.), Catepan of Italy in 1008–1010
Gregory Kourkouas, doux of Philippopolis in 1089–1091
Michael II Kourkouas, Ecumenical Patriarch of Constantinople in 1143–1146.

Sources